Regierungsbezirk Oppeln was a Regierungsbezirk, or government region, in the Prussian Province of Silesia, from 1813 to 1945, which covered the south-eastern part of Silesia.

Geography 
The capital of the Regierungsbezirk was the Upper Silesian city of Oppeln. Other important cities in the region included Kattowitz, Gleiwitz, Beuthen, Königshütte, Hindenburg, Ratibor, Neustadt, Neisse and Kreuzburg.

It comprised the following districts (as of 1910):

Population

Ethno-linguistic structure

References 

1945 disestablishments in Germany
1813 establishments in Prussia
Opole
History of Silesia
Government regions of Prussia
Province of Upper Silesia
Province of Silesia